This is a list of rivers in Togo. This list is arranged by drainage basin, with respective tributaries indented under each larger stream's name.

Gulf of Guinea

Volta River (Ghana)
Todzie River
Oti River (Pendjari River)
Arli River
Doubodo River
Moribonga River
Mo River
Katassou River
Kara River
Kawa River
Kpasa River
Koumongou River
Koulpélogo River
Rivière River
Singou River
Toubili River
Mono River
Amou River
Amoutchou River
Oulou River
Anie River
Couffo River
Gbaga Canal
Lake Togo
Haho River
Sio River
Khra River
Nokpoué River
Nymassila
Ogou River
Zio River

References
Central Intelligence Agency, 2007
Ramsar Sites Information Service
 GEOnet Names Server

Togo
Rivers